The Forger of London is a 1961 West German crime film directed by Harald Reinl and starring Karin Dor, Hellmut Lange and Siegfried Lowitz. It is an adaptation of Edgar Wallace's 1927 novel The Forger, and part of a long-running series of German Wallace films made during the decade.

It was shot at the Wandsbek Studios in Hamburg, with location shooting at Herdringen Castle. The film's sets were designed by the art directors Mathias Matthies and Ellen Schmidt.

Cast

Production
The film is an adaptation of Edgar Wallace's novel The Forger.

The sets were designed by the art directors Mathias Matthies and Ellen Schmidt.

Release
The FSK gave the film a rating of 16 and up and found it not appropriate for screenings on public holidays.

It premiered on 15 August 1961 at the Neues Bavaria cinema at Aachen.

See also
 The Forger (1928)

References

Bibliography

External links 
 

1961 films
1960s mystery thriller films
German mystery thriller films
West German films
1960s German-language films
Films directed by Harald Reinl
Films based on British novels
Films set in London
Films based on works by Edgar Wallace
German black-and-white films
Remakes of British films
Constantin Film films
Counterfeit money in film
Films shot at Wandsbek Studios
1960s German films